Gahnia hystrix is a tussock-forming perennial in the family Cyperaceae, that is native to parts of Kangaroo Island.

References

hystrix
Plants described in 1927
Flora of Kangaroo Island
Taxa named by John McConnell Black